Cheiracanthium africanum is a spider species found in Africa and Réunion.

References 

africanum
Spiders of Africa
Spiders of Réunion
Spiders described in 1921